"One Good Man" is a single by Canadian country music artist Michelle Wright. Released in 1994, it was the first single from her album The Reasons Why. The song reached #1 on the RPM Country Tracks chart in October 1994.

Chart performance

Year-end charts

References

1994 singles
Michelle Wright songs
Arista Nashville singles
Music videos directed by Steven Goldmann
Songs written by Steve Bogard
Songs written by Rick Giles
1994 songs